This is a list of members of the South Australian Legislative Council from 1933 to 1938

This term was extended to 5 years to maintain synchronism with the Legislative Assembly elections.

 The Labor Party had split into three different factions prior to the 1933 state election due to disputes over the handling of the Great Depression. In the Legislative Council, Stanley Whitford was re-elected for the Parliamentary Labor Party, which consisted of most of the former Cabinet and their supporters, who had been expelled from official Labor. Oscar Oates, a new official Labor candidate, was elected, and Frank Condon, not up for re-election, remained with official Labor. Whitford ceased to be a member of the PLP, renounced socialism and declared himself an "individualist" in March 1934. He was the only member of the splinter Labor parties in either house who were re-elected in 1933 to not be readmitted to the Labor Party, and continued as an independent for the rest of his career.
 LCL MLC William Morrow died on 3 July 1934. Lyell McEwin won the resulting by-election on 20 October.
 LCL MLC William Humphrey Harvey died on 6 November 1935. Edward Holden won the resulting by-election on 14 December.

References
Parliament of South Australia — Statistical Record of the Legislature

Members of South Australian parliaments by term
20th-century Australian politicians